Buranovo is a rural locality (a selo) in Buranovsky Selsoviet of Malopurginsky District of the Udmurt Republic, Russia located  from the city of Izhevsk,  from the city of Sarapul, and  from Malaya Purga, the administrative center of the district. As of January 1, 2011, the population was estimated to be 658 residents, of whom 123 are employed in education.
Municipally, it is a part of Buranovskoye Rural Settlement of Malopurginsky Municipal District.

Notable people

Buranovskiye Babushki, a folk group who represented Russia in Eurovision Song Contest 2012, are from Buranovo.

References

Notes

Sources

Rural localities in Udmurtia
Sarapulsky Uyezd
